Antiochus of Syracuse was a Greek historian, who flourished around 420 BC. Little is known of Antiochus' life, but his works, of which only fragments remain, enjoyed a high reputation because of their accuracy. He wrote a History of Sicily from the earliest times to 424 BC, which was used by Thucydides, and the Colonizing of Italy, frequently referred to by Strabo and Dionysius of Halicarnassus. He is one of the authors (= FGrHist 555) whose fragments were collected in Felix Jacoby's Fragmente der griechischen Historiker.

References 

 Müller, Fragmenta Historicorum Graecorum, i.
 Wölfflin, Antiochos von Syrakus, 1872.

Attribution
 Endnotes:
 

Classical-era Greek historians
Historians from Magna Graecia
5th-century BC Syracusans
5th-century BC historians
Writers of lost works
Ancient Greek historians known only from secondary sources